Patrick Keiller (born 1950) is a British film-maker, writer and lecturer.

Biography

Keiller was born in 1950, in Blackpool and studied at the Bartlett School of Architecture, University College London. In 1979 he joined the Royal College of Art's Department of Environmental Media as a postgraduate student. For a time he taught architecture at the University of East London and fine art at Middlesex University.

His first film was Stonebridge Park (1981) followed by Norwood (1983), The End (1986), Valtos (1987) and The Clouds (1989). These films are typified by their use of subjective camera and voice-over. This was a technique that was further refined in his longer films London (1994) and Robinson in Space (1997), both of which are narrated by an unnamed character (voiced by Paul Scofield) who accompanies his friend and onetime lover, the unseen Robinson, in a series of excursions around London. Robinson is involved with research into the "problems" of London and, in the second film, England. The films are seen as a critique of the United Kingdom's economic landscape under the Conservative governments of 1979-97. A third film, Robinson in Ruins was released in November 2010. It was one of the outcomes of a three-year research project entitled The Future of Landscape and the Moving Image. The actress Vanessa Redgrave assumed the role of narrator.

In 2000, Keiller completed The Dilapidated Dwelling. This film was made for television, but was never broadcast. It features the voice of Tilda Swinton, and its subject matter is the state of the UK's housing.

Bibliography
Robinson in Space (1999) by Patrick Keiller (includes a conversation with Patrick Wright); published by Reaktion Books.
The view from the Train: Cities and Other Landscapes (2013); published by Verso.
London (2020); published by FUEL.
 Christie, Ian, The man on the Ealing tram: Retro futures and Patrick Keiller's The City of the Future at the BFI Gallery, in Fabrizi, Elisabetta (ed), The BFI Gallery Book, BFI, London 2011, pp. 46–51.

References

External links
Patrick Keiller website
Interview with Patrick Keiller in MUBI
Interview with Patrick Keiller in Time Out magazine
Interview with 3:AM Magazine (2010)
Interview with 3:AM Magazine (2021)
Biography of Patrick Keiller at BFI Screenonline
BFI Interview
Biography, synopses etc. at Luxonline

English film directors
Psychogeographers
Academics of the Royal College of Art
Alumni of the Royal College of Art
Alumni of The Bartlett
Keiller, Patrick
1950 births
Living people
Date of birth missing (living people)